Orange juice usually refers to the fruit juice obtained from squeezing orange.

Orange Juice may also refer to:

 Orange Juice (band), a Scottish post-punk band
 Orange Juice (film), a 2010 Russian comedy film
 The Orange Juice, a 1984 album
 Orange Juice, a 2004 J-ska album from Yum!Yum!ORANGE
 Oran "Juice" Jones (born 1957), an American R&B singer
 Concierto de Aranjuez, a composition for classical guitar and orchestra
 "Orange Juice", a song by Melanie Martinez from her 2019 album K-12
Orange Juice, a fictional orangutan in Life of Pi

See also
OJ (disambiguation)